EUBG 2014 II or EUBG 2014-2 is an EU Battlegroup consisting of around 3,000 troops from Belgium, Germany, Luxembourg, Spain, the Netherlands and North Macedonia. It was on standby from 1 July until 31 December 2014.

Composition and equipment 
EUBG 2014 II included approximately 745 Dutch soldiers:
14 CV90s with 220 infantry troops;
14 Bushmasters with 180 Airmobile Brigade troops;
2 Helicopter detachments (Chinooks) with 180 troops;
65 members of staff for the Belgian Force Headquarters and Infantry Task Force;
100 National Support Element detachment (logistics and field medics).

Belgium provided most troops: 1,800 soldiers. It formed a binational Infantry Task Force with the Netherlands, consisting of 4 infantry combat units. The 2 Dutch units were one heavy infantry company and one air-assault company; the 2 Belgian units were one light infantry company on Dingo 2s and a company of Piranha IIICs with DF90 (Direct Fire capability 90mm cannon). The Belgian helicopter group consisted of 6 Agusta 109s.

Germany provided CH-53 “Stallion” transport helicopters.

Spain provided field artillery (155mm cannon), a Signal Intelligence (SIGINT) unit and an air-defence platoon. There was also a team of Belgian and Spanish engineers, and psy ops capabilities.

Luxembourg provided a reconnaissance company.

North Macedonia was an exceptional participant, as the country is neither an EU nor NATO member.

Exercises 

In late February 2014, EUBG 2014 II held an exercise codenamed "Rampant Lion" in Grafenwöhr, Germany. In June 2014, EUBG 2014 II conducted a training exercise in the Ardennes, codenamed "Quick Lion", to prevent ethnic violence between the "Greys" and the "Whites" in the imaginary country of "Blueland".

References 

Battlegroups of the European Union